Comptonia is an extinct genus of prehistoric sea stars in the family Goniasteridae. Species are from the Cretaceous of Canada (Alberta) and France. The type species, C. elegans (syn. Goniaster (Stellaster) elegans, Stellaster elegans) was recovered from France.

References

External links 

 
 

Prehistoric starfish genera
Goniasteridae
Fossils of Canada
Fossils of France